Priboj is a town and municipality located in the Zlatibor District of southwestern Serbia. The population of the town is 14,920, while the population of the municipality is 27,133.

Geography
The municipality of Priboj is located between municipality of Čajetina in the north, municipality of Nova Varoš in the east, municipality of Prijepolje in the south-east, border with Montenegro in the south-west, and border with Bosnia and Herzegovina in the north-west. A Bosnian-Herzegovinian exclave (Međurječje village) is surrounded by the Priboj municipality.

The town of Priboj lies on the river Lim. It is 5 km away from Uvac, a smaller river that is the border between Bosnia and Herzegovina and Serbia.

Climate
Priboj has an oceanic climate (Köppen climate classification: Cfb).

History

The hamlet of Jarmovac south of Priboj is the site of a prehistoric copper mine shaft which is one of the first evidences of human metallurgy, first identified in 1937, now dated to the 4th millennium BCE in the late Vinča culture.

During the medieval times, the region around modern city of Priboj in the lower valley of the Lim river was called "Dabar" and it belonged to the medieval Serbia until the Turkish invasion in the middle of 15th century. Between 1459 and 1463, the town of Priboj was first mentioned in written documents of the Ottoman Empire.

Settlements
Aside from the town of Priboj, the municipality includes the following settlements:

 Banja
 Batkovići
 Brezna
 Bučje
 Dobrilovići
 Živinice
 Zabrđe
 Zabrnjica
 Zagradina
 Zaostro
 Jelača
 Kalafati
 Kaluđerovići
 Kasidoli
 Kratovo
 Krnjača
 Kukurovići
 Mažići
 Miliješ
 Plašće
 Požegrmac
 Pribojska Goleša
 Pribojske Čelice
 Rača
 Ritošići
 Sjeverin
 Sočice
 Strmac
 Hercegovačka Goleša
 Crnugovići
 Crnuzi
 Čitluk
 Akmačići

Demographics

According to the last official census done in 2011, the Municipality of Priboj has 27,133 inhabitants with 49.4% of the municipality's population living in the urban areas.

Ethnic groups
In 1991, the population of the Priboj municipality numbered 35,951 people, and was composed of Serbs (67.26%), Muslims (30.39%) and others. Most of those who in 1991 census declared themselves as ethnic Muslims, in the next census in 2002 declared themselves as Bosniaks, while the smaller number of them still declare themselves as Muslims by ethnicity.

In 2002, the population of the Priboj town numbered 19,564 people, and was composed of Serbs (13,386), Bosniaks (4,396), ethnic Muslims(1,042) and others. As of 2011, most of Priboj's population is of Serbian ethnicity (75.9%), with nearly 21.2% being Bosniaks and Muslims.

The ethnic composition of the municipality:

Economy
Today, most of Priboj's economy is based on agriculture, services and partly industry. Priboj is home to the FAP Corporation, which pushed Priboj's development during the 1970s and 1980s, when it was one of the biggest producers of trucks and buses in the former Yugoslavia. Since the 1990s, FAP has been working in limited capacity and since the 2010s its only remaining production is military-oriented.

As of September 2017, Priboj has one of 14 free economic zones established in Serbia.

The following table gives a preview of total number of registered people employed in legal entities per their core activity (as of 2018):

Image gallery

Notable people

 Mustafa Hasanagić (b. 1941), footballer
 Slavenko Kuzeljević (b. 1958), football manager and former player
 Ana Bekuta (b. 1959), folk singer
 Alem Toskić (b. 1982), handball player
 Mirsad Terzić (b. 1983), handball player
 Ahmet Delić (b. 1986), footballer
 Aleksandar Prijović (b. 1990), footballer
 Željka Nikolić (b. 1991), handball player
 Amela Terzić (b. 1993), middle-distance runner
 Marko Gudurić (b. 1995), basketball player

See also
 List of places in Serbia
 Bosniaks of Serbia
 Sandžak

References

External links

 
Info portal - Priboj Online

 
Populated places in Zlatibor District
Municipalities and cities of Šumadija and Western Serbia